The Bishop of Ardagh was a separate episcopal title which took its name after the village of Ardagh, County Longford in the Republic of Ireland. It was used by the Roman Catholic Church until 1756, and intermittently by the Church of Ireland until 1839.

Tradition states that a monastery was founded at Ardagh by St Patrick, and that his nephew, St. Mel (died c.490), was its bishop or abbot. Although there is no historical or archaeological evidence to support it, Mel is regarded as the founder of the see.

The diocese of Ardagh was established in 1111 at the Synod of Rathbreasail as the see for east Connacht. At the subsequent Synod of Kells in 1152, its area was reduced to the territory of the Conmaicne.

Ardagh Cathedral was severely damaged by warfare in 1496 and was never restored. There are remains of an eighth- or ninth-century church at Ardagh, which is known as St. Mel's Cathedral, although it dates from three centuries after the saint's death, and predates the introduction of a diocesan system in Ireland.

Following the Reformation, there were parallel apostolic successions. In the Roman Catholic Church, the bishopric has been united with Clonmacnoise since 30 May 1756. Until the mid 19th-century, the parish church of Ballymahon had served as a pro-cathedral for the Roman Catholic Diocese of Ardagh and Clonmacnoise. A new St Mel's Cathedral in Longford was built for the diocese between 1840 and 1856. The building was destroyed by fire in the early hours of Christmas Day 2009.

In the Church of Ireland, Ardagh was intermittently held with Kilmore between 1604–1633, 1661–1692 and 1693–1742, then held with Tuam 1742–1839. Ardagh was again united to Kilmore 1839–1841. Since 1841, Ardagh has been part of the bishopric of Kilmore, Elphin and Ardagh.

Pre-Reformation bishops

Bishops during the Reformation

Post-Reformation bishops

Church of Ireland succession

Roman Catholic succession

Notes
  These two bishops appear as rival bishops, and the rivalry was continued to 1237.
  There was a disputed election after the death of Uilliam Mac Carmaic in 1373. Cairbre Ó Feaghail died at Avignon in 1378, and it is not certain that he ever got possession of the see. John Aubrey, O.P., friar of Trim, was one of the three rival candidates in 1373. (The third candidate was Richard O'Farrell, Dean of Ardagh).
  The date of Cormac Mác Shamhradháin's resignation is uncertain, but a 'Joh.', bishop-elect of Ardagh, was in Rome in 1463.

References

Bibliography

External links
The Catholic Diocese of Ardagh and Clonmacnaois
The Diocese of Kilmore, Elphin and Ardagh (Church of Ireland)

Roman Catholic Diocese of Ardagh and Clonmacnoise
Lists of Anglican bishops and archbishops
Lists of Irish bishops and archbishops
Bishop of Ardagh
 Bishops of Ardaghh
 Bishops
 Bishops
Conmaicne Maigh Rein
Conmaicne Angaile